Celtis tala (or Celtis ehrenbergiana), known as tala, is a medium size deciduous tree, native to tropical and subtropical South America. With small to medium-sized spines, its one of the main components of the Gran Chaco prairies and certain areas of the Argentinian pampa.

Morphology
The tala is a medium to large sized tree, sometimes reaching 12m high. According to water availability it may become arboreus or shrubby. It prefers dry or slightly moist, well drained soil. When arboreus the trunk is rather tortuous, nearing 40 cm in diameter. When shrubby, it produces several branched trunks of 20 cm in diameter. Its birch is light colored, gray to brown. The Tala tends to branch abundantly, producing a dense mesh of branches in zigzag patterns, with strong spines in the foliar axis, 1,5 or more, cm long.

The leaves are alternate, petiolate and simple, their base rounded and the margin serrated in the apical region. Leaves are trinervate, acuminate, of a dark green colour. This tree flowers in spring, producing inconspicuous yellowish pentamerous flowers. Since it presents hermaphrodite flowers, it is self-fertile. Tala fruit is a small drupe, 1 cm wide that hangs in short clusters. Not very fleshy and with a proportionally large seed within, it is however very sweet and pleasant to the taste.

Usage
Though edible by humans there is no market or habit of consumption, these fruits are mostly part of birds and several insect species diets.
It is appreciated by lumbers since its wood is tough and rather heavy. Produces excellent wood fuel. The tala rather small trunk allows only small carved objects be obtained. It is used in hand tool handles and small crafts.

References

tala
Trees of Argentina